Several ships have shared the name SS Athenia, including:

 , launched in 1903 and sunk in 1917
 , launched in 1922 and sunk in 1939

Ship names